Hannelore Plattner is an Austrian luger who competed in the early 1970s. A natural track luger, she won the gold medal in the women's singles event at the 1970 FIL European Luge Natural Track Championships in Kapfenberg, Austria.

References
Natural track European Championships results 1970-2006.

Austrian female lugers
Living people
Year of birth missing (living people)
20th-century Austrian women